Nass Mlah City (Nās Mlāḥ Siti, meaning : The City of Good People) was a 2002–2006 Algerian comedy TV series directed by Djafar Gacem. It first aired on Télévision Algérienne, Canal Algérie and A3 on 6 November 2002 and has since then produced over 119 episodes. It is considered as the most popular sitcom of Algeria in the 2000s.

Overview

Cast 

Nass Mlah City consists of several Algerian actors whose personages change according to roles in each episode. The main and most present character in the series is the famous actress, singer and comedian Biyouna. Younger actors include the comedian and model Kahina Belarbi.

Episodes by detail

References

External links 
  on Humour DZ

Algerian television series
2000s Algerian television series
2002 Algerian television series debuts
2006 Algerian television series endings
Algerian comedy television series
Public Establishment of Television original programming